Mirinda Carfrae (born 26 March 1981) is an Australian professional triathlete and an Ironman Triathlon world champion. Carfrae has achieved podium positions in six of her seven attempts at the Ironman World Championships: 1st-place finishes (2010, 2013, 2014), three 2nd-place finishes (2009, 2011, 2016) and a 3rd place (2012, behind Leanda Cave and Caroline Steffen). She also won the 2007 Ironman 70.3 World Championship.

Carfrae held the Ironman Championship course record (8:52:14, set in 2013), until 2016 when it was beaten by Daniela Ryf (8:46:46) On her debut in 2009, she set a new course record for the marathon of 2:56:51, beating Wellington's record of 2:57:44 set the previous year. She again set new course records for the marathon in 2010 (2:53:32), 2011 (2:52:09, where Wellington—suffering from serious injuries—also beat Carfrae's 2010 record), 2013 (2:50:38, where only two men recorded a faster time), and 2014 (2:50:26).

Career 
Carfrae competed in her first triathlon in 2000, at the age of 19. She went on to represent Australia at the Junior and U23 level, winning a silver medal at the 2003 ITU U23 World Championships. In 2004, she won a silver medal at the Salford Triathlon leg of the ITU Triathlon World Cup. She was an Australian Institute of Sport scholarship holder.

Long distance 
Carfrae's first attempt at longer distances was at the Lake Tinaroo Half Ironman in September 2002, where she finished in second place behind Rebekah Keat, setting a new run course record of 1:21:20. Referring to this race, she later wrote, "I just remember feeling more comfortable racing the longer distance, and from then I knew I would be racing full Ironman at some point in future."

Carfrae achieved her first World Championship medal at the 2005 ITU Long Distance World Championships, where she finished 2nd in a time of 6:27:11. In 2007, she won the Ironman 70.3 World Championships in a course record time of 4:07:25. This win entitled Carfrae to race at the full Ironman World Championships at Kona, but she deferred her entry to 2009, when she felt she was ready for the longer distance. At the 2009 Ironman World Championship, Carfrae's first Ironman race, she finished second behind Chrissie Wellington, breaking Wellington's 2008 course record for the women's marathon with a time of 2:56:51. She wrote, "My first tri was at the end of 1999—my first Ironman was 10 years later. I waited until I felt I was physically and mentally strong enough to go the distance, and until I could be seriously competitive."

Carfrae set a course record at the Ironman World Championship at Kona, Hawaii in 2013 with a time of 8:52:14.  Additionally, at that race she set a women's record time for the run portion of the course at 2:50:38. In 2015, she started the Ironman World Championship race at Kona, but withdrew from the bike leg due to pain from injuries sustained in a collision with a car earlier that week.

Results 

 source:

References

External links 
 Official website

1981 births
Australian female triathletes
Australian Institute of Sport triathletes
Ironman world champions
Living people
Sportspeople from Brisbane
Sportswomen from Queensland